The women's tournament was won by the team representing .

Preliminary round

 Qualified for quarterfinals
Source: Paralympic.org

Medal Round

Source: Paralympic.org

Classification 5-8 

Source: Paralympic.org

Ranking

References

Women
International women's basketball competitions hosted by the United States
1996 in women's basketball